Saint Julie may refer to:

 Saint Julie, Catholic saint
 Sainte-Julie, Quebec
 Sainte-Julie, Ain, a commune of the Ain département, in France
 Saint Julie Billiart Parish, Roman Catholic parish in California

See also
 Saint Julia (disambiguation)